David Charles Weatherburn is an Australian-trained, New Zealand chemistry academic.

Academic career

After a MSc and PhD at the University of Sydney in Australia, he did a Postdoc at Purdue University and a brief period at University of Queensland, he joined Victoria University of Wellington in the early 1970s and remained there until his official retirement in 2009. His specialism was coordination chemistry and spectroscopy, but he had a popular sideline in science shows.

In 2011 he was given a Meritorious Service Award by the Tertiary Education Union.

Selected works 
 Hotzelmann, R., Wieghardt, K., Floerke, U., Haupt, H. J., Weatherburn, D. C., Bonvoisin, J., ... & Girerd, J. J. (1992). Spin exchange coupling in asymmetric heterodinuclear complexes containing the. mu.-oxo-bis (. mu.-acetato) dimetal core. Journal of the American Chemical Society, 114(5), 1681–1696.
 Bhula, R., Osvath, P., & Weatherburn, D. C. (1988). Complexes of tridentate and pentadentate macrocyclic ligands. Coordination chemistry reviews, 91, 89–213.
 Weatherburn, D. C., Billo, E. J., Jones, J. P., & Margerum, D. W. (1970). Effect of ring size on the stability of polyamine complexes containing linked consecutive rings. Inorganic Chemistry, 9(6), 1557–1559.
 Bhula, R., Gainsford, G. J., & Weatherburn, D. C. (1988). A new model for the oxygen-evolving complex in photosynthesis. A trinuclear. mu. 3-oxomanganese (III) complex which contains a. mu.-peroxo group. Journal of the American Chemical Society, 110(22), 7550–7552.

References

External links
 

Living people
New Zealand chemists
University of Sydney alumni
Academic staff of the Victoria University of Wellington
Purdue University faculty
Academic staff of the University of Queensland
Year of birth missing (living people)